Major Albrecht Lanz (25 February 1898 – 27 January 1942) was the first Kommandant of Guernsey and Jersey in the Channel Islands in World War II and a recipient of the Knight's Cross of the Iron Cross.

Early life 
Lanz was born on 25 February 1898, in Entringen in the Kingdom of Württemberg of the German Empire.

Career 

On 1 June 1940, Lanz arrived at Guernsey Airport with the Luftwaffe, as part of an attempt to discover the level of military preparedness of the islands (though they had been demilitarised, the information was kept secret until 28 June). Upon his arrival with his interpreter Major Maass. Lanz states that the moment command was transferred to him was "the proudest in this war". When Lanz went to Sark on 3 July to see Dame Sybil Hathaway, she noted that "Lanz was a tall, alert, quick-spoken officer, with dark hair and dark eyes. In civilian life he had been a Doctor of both Law and Philosophy, and I believe he came from a family of agricultural machinery manufacturers in Stuttgart [...] a fair minded man who would never trick anyone by low cunning". Ambrose Sherwill stated that he was "every inch a soldier and not very easy to get to know but absolutely straight and kindly".

Lanz was given a Knight's Cross of the Iron Cross on 4 September 1940. It was noted in Die Wehrmacht in 1940, and an American military translation revealed the following. Whilst the German forces were attacking Belgium, specifically during the crossing of the River Lys, around Theilt (potentially Thielt). The battalion was attempting to attack Gothem, a village, on the 24 May 1940, but beaten back. The battalion again tried on the 26 May through grain fields with limited visibility due to the grain, and under enemy fire, the attack was failing. Lanz organised the group and they attacked successfully, taking several enemies prisoner.

However, he left the post at the rank of Oberstleutnant and later transferred to the Eastern Front. There, it was stated of Lanz and his regiment, the 396th Infantry Regiment, "I envy the men under this wonderful leader and person. He's a man who has intelligence written all over his tanned face, which is full of humour. He has a kind word or a joke for everyone". He died on the Eastern Front on the 27 January 1942 at Lazerett in Smolensk, Soviet Union in hospital of wounds he sustained.

Awards
Knight's Cross of the Iron Cross   on 4 September 1940 as Major and commander of the I./Infanterie-Regiment 396

References

Citations

Bibliography

 
 

Recipients of the Knight's Cross of the Iron Cross
1898 births
1942 deaths
German Army personnel killed in World War II
People from Tübingen (district)
German Army officers of World War II
Military personnel from Baden-Württemberg
Guernsey in World War II